Susannah Doyle (born 5 July 1966) is an English actress, best known for her roles as Joy Merryweather in Drop The Dead Donkey and as Avril Burke in Ballykissangel.

The daughter of the Irish actor Tony Doyle, she realised that she wished to follow in his footsteps when, aged about five or six, she was taken to see him work, often in tiny theatres with audience and actors close together. She trained at the London Academy of Music and Dramatic Art.

Her big TV break came in 1991 with the role of Joy, the intelligent, acid-tongued secretary and foil to her corporate-speak boss, in the Channel 4 comedy Drop The Dead Donkey. Other TV roles followed, including two episodes of Soldier, Soldier in 1996 and A Touch of Frost in 1997.

When her father died in 2000, the producers of Ballykissangel asked whether she would join the cast. She had reservations over her ability to cope emotionally but took on the part of Avril Burke.

In 2001, she also appeared in an episode of Cold Feet and one of Pie in the Sky. In 2010 she appeared in "Your Sudden Death Question", S4:E3 of Lewis. In 2012 she appeared in an episode of police comedy Vexed.

Since 2001, she has been pursuing parallel careers of scriptwriting and acting.

In October 2013, she appeared in Sarah Rutherford's "Adult Supervision" at Park Theatre (London).

In 2016, she appeared in "Shut Up and Dance", an episode of the anthology series Black Mirror.

Filmography
Scandal (1989) ... Jackie
Don't Go Breaking My Heart (1999) ... Diane
About a Boy (2002) ... Bitter Ex-Girlfriend
 Midsomer Murders - The Fisher King (2004) ... Vanessa Stone
A Congregation of Ghosts (2009) .... Barbara Baxter
Black Mirror: "Shut Up and Dance" (2016) .... Blackmailed Woman 
Minder (TV series)- Susie Groves.
 The Last Vermeer'' (2020)... Johana

References

External links

1966 births
Living people
Actresses from London
English film actresses
English film directors
English film producers
English people of Irish descent
English radio writers
Women radio writers
English television actresses
People from Kingston upon Thames
Alumni of Richmond upon Thames College
Alumni of the London Academy of Music and Dramatic Art